The eighth season of Big Brother Germany lasted exactly half a year from 7 January 2008 to 7 July 2008 and was shown on RTL II. Wherein a daily show the previous day's events were summarized. In a weekly live show, hosted by Charlotte Karlinder, Miriam Pielhau and Jürgen Milski, nominations and evictions were held. Usually, the housemates nominated each other with the viewers voting for eviction of a nominee (by phone). Additionally, the 24-hour live TV channel was brought back and was again offered by Premiere for 15 € a month.

Summary
For the first time since Big Brother: The Battle, the house was divided into two areas: rich and poor. The rich area, holding 6 housemates, was luxurious with comfortable furniture, a wide range of food and beverages, sufficient cigarette supplies and alcoholic drinks (beer, wine, champagne). The poor area, also inhabited by 6 housemates, on the other hand, was equipped like a canteen kitchen. The food supplies were rather poor with limited cigarette supplies and usually no alcoholic beverages. Both areas were separated by a small wall, which wasn't allowed to be crossed and over which no "smuggling" was allowed. A spiral staircase, used by both teams, lead to the upper floor which held the bedrooms. While the rich area's bedroom had luxurious double beds, the poor team's bedroom contained an operating-table-like structure, on which the housemates slept in sleeping bags.

From time to time (usually during the weekly live show) there were matches in which both teams competed against each other, resulting in the winning team changing into or continuing to live in the rich area. In additional matches teams could compete for rewards (e.g. a large plate with burgers and fries, being able to play Wii in a separated room, etc.).

The winner was Silke "Isi" Kaufmann who won 250,000 €. The season's theme song was "Choose to be me" by Sunrise Avenue.

Housemates

Nominations table

Notes

 As new housemates Anki and Nadine were immune - they could nominate but not be nominated. The housemates were voting for who they wanted to evict and the two housemates with the most votes were fake evicted. They returned to the house the following day.
 The public voted for which team (the Rich team or the Poor team) they wanted to be immune from nomination. They chose the Poor Team and hence Alex, Anki, Isi, Marcel and Melly are safe from nomination this week. When voting the public can vote to save a housemate, or to evict a housemate. The evictee is decided by the housemate who has, of their total, the highest percentage of evict votes. For example, this week, of all the votes cast to save/evict her 90.8% of Bianca's votes were to evict her. Whereas only 47.0% of Rebecca's votes were to evict her. Therefore, with the higher percentage of evict votes, Bianca was evicted.
 This week the public were allowed to nominate for 2 points. They chose Nadine to nominate, although this had no effect. As new housemate Neila was immune.
 Caro, as a new housemate, was immune this week. The public also selected Rebecca to be immune. Had she not been chosen for immunity, Rebecca would have faced the public vote this week.
 This week housemates (apart from Jenny who, as a new housemate, is immune) grouped together into pairs of Alex & Caro, Hassan & Nadine, Isi & Rebecca, Kevin & Marcel and Melly & Patrick. They nominated individually, but each individual nomination for them also counted as a nomination for their partner. After nominations Isi & Rebecca and Melly & Patrick both had the most nominations with 4 each and, with 79.1% of the Vote, Melly and Patrick were chosen to face the public vote this week.
 Marcel S. and Serafino were immune as new housemates. Nadine was also chosen by the public to be immune - if she had not been immune she would have faced the public vote.
 This week it was the housemate with the most nominations who would get to choose the three nominees. Tanja was immune as a new housemate, and Serafino was also chosen for immunity by the public. Alex received the most nomination points with 5 and was hence immune and in charge of choosing the three nominees. He selected Hassan, Isi and Marcel S.
 Mandy was immune as a new housemate and Isi won immunity in a public vote. This week, the housemates made 2 nominations, the first nomination was for an "old housemate" (shown in the top of the nomination box) and the second nomination was for a "new housemate". A new housemates is considered as any that entered on or after Day 64 (Franco, Mandy, Nora, Serafino, Steffi and Tanja). Serafino received the most votes for the new housemates and faced the public vote. Out of the old housemates Isi received the most votes, but had already been chosen for immunity. Alex and Hassan were next, and the public chose Alex to face the public vote alongside Serafino.
 This week the one housemate with the most nominations would be up for eviction. That housemate then has to choose another two housemates (one old and one new) to be also up for eviction. As both Nora and Tanja received the most nominations with 4 each, the public decided which should be the first nominee and chose Nora, who then selected Isi and Tanja to join her as nominees.
 This week it was the housemate's mothers who nominated on the housemate's behalf. Steffi's mother declined to take part and therefore forfeited Steffi's nomination. Marcel was immune after being chosen by the public.
 The public chose Marcel to be immune this week.
 All female housemates were immune this week. The public decided that Marcel should automatically face the public vote as punishment for rule breaking and Marcel was hence automatically nominated alongside the two nominees.
 In the final round of nominations housemates were allowed to nominate themselves. Isi was awarded immunity by the public.
 For the final week, the public was voted for who they wanted to win.

Guests

See also
Main Article about the show

External links
Official Homepage
Housemate pictures, Nominations and Evictions
All profiles if the housemates season 8 (German)

2008 German television seasons
08